Fencing events were contested at the 1989 Summer Universiade in Duisburg, West Germany.

Medal overview

Men's events

Women's events

Medal table

References
 Universiade fencing medalists on HickokSports

1989 Summer Universiade
Universiade
Fencing at the Summer Universiade
International fencing competitions hosted by Germany